Chase-Hubbard-Williams House is a historic home located at Lockport in Niagara County, New York.  It is a stone structure built in 1870 in the Italianate style. A 1900 remodeling was in the Colonial Revival style.  In 1958, the property was acquired by the Presbytery of Buffalo and Niagara and converted to a nursing home.  It is one of approximately 75 stone residences remaining in the city of Lockport.

It was listed on the National Register of Historic Places in 2008. It is located in the High and Locust Streets Historic District.

References

Houses on the National Register of Historic Places in New York (state)
Colonial Revival architecture in New York (state)
Houses completed in 1870
Houses in Niagara County, New York
National Register of Historic Places in Niagara County, New York
Historic district contributing properties in New York (state)